Brian Parizot Meunier (born 30 April 1999) is a retired Mexican professional footballer who played as a defender.

Club career

Youth 
Parizot Meunier spent time with the Chipas F.C. youth teams before moving to Spring, Texas and joining the academy of the Houston Dynamo. He left the Dynamo academy on 1 August 2018.

Cafetaleros de Tapachula 
Parizot Meunier joined Mexican side Cafetaleros de Tapachula in January 2019 after leaving Houston. He made his professional and Cadetaleros de Tapachula debut on 22 January 2019, playing all 90 minutes in a 1–0 win over Cimarrones de Sonora in a Copa MX match. Parizot Meunier made his league debut on 5 March 2019 when he started in a 3–1 win against Tampico Madero F.C. in an Ascenso MX match.

Career Statistics

References

1999 births
Living people
Mexican footballers
Mexican expatriate footballers
Association football defenders
Footballers from Mexico City
Ascenso MX players
Cafetaleros de Chiapas footballers
Houston Dynamo FC players
Mexican expatriate sportspeople in the United States
Expatriate soccer players in the United States